The Manchukuo national football team  was an international football team from Manchukuo and Japanese-occupied eastern Inner Mongolia, created by former Qing Dynasty officials with help from Imperial Japan in 1932. Due to the Non-Recognition Policy of the United States and other countries towards Manchukuo, the team was not permitted to join FIFA, and was therefore not eligible to enter the World Cup.
Manchuria played three international matches all against Japan during the late 1930s, losing each one of them, conceding 16 goals and scoring no goals.

The first two matches were held in September 1939 as part of the "Championship Games of Amity with Japan, Manchukuo, and China" ( Nichi-Man-Ka Kokan Kyogikai ), a Japanese-organized successor to the Far Eastern Championship Games which had fallen into dysfunction with the outbreak of the Second Sino-Japanese War. The third match took place at the East Asian Games ( Toa Taikai ), which were held to both celebrate the 2600th Anniversary of the Japanese Empire, but also to celebrate the start of the Greater East Asia Co-Prosperity Sphere.

List of games played by Manchukuo
All scores lists Manchuria's goal tally first

Manchukuo's score is shown first in each case.

References

Former national association football teams in Asia
Sports in Manchukuo
1932 establishments in China